Francis Joseph Mullins (born May 14, 1957) is an American former professional baseball player. He played in Major League Baseball (MLB) as an infielder. Mullins played at least one game at all four infield positions, but saw most of his playing time at third base and shortstop.

Career
Mullins attended Santa Clara University, and played college baseball for the Santa Clara Broncos. He was drafted by the Chicago White Sox in the 1978 and 1979 amateur drafts. After the 1979 draft, Mullins went professional.

Mullins made his MLB debut with the White Sox in 1980. After the 1983 season, the White Sox traded Mullins to the Cincinnati Reds for Steve Christmas. Weeks later, he was selected by the San Francisco Giants in the Rule 5 draft. After playing in minor league baseball in 1985, the Cleveland Indians purchased Mullins from the Giants. Mullins played for the Indians in 1986, and was released after the season.

References

External links

1957 births
Living people
American expatriate baseball players in Canada
Baseball players from Oakland, California
Chicago White Sox players
Cleveland Indians players
Denver Bears players
Edmonton Trappers players
Glens Falls White Sox players
Iowa Oaks players
Knoxville Sox players
Major League Baseball infielders
Maine Guides players
Phoenix Giants players
San Francisco Giants players
Santa Clara Broncos baseball players